Jabukovac is a village in central Croatia, in the Town of Petrinja, Sisak-Moslavina County. It is connected by the D30 highway.

Demographics
According to the 2011 census, the village of Jabukovac had 141 inhabitants. This represents 43.38% of its pre-war population according to the 1991 census.

The 1991 census recorded that 86.77% of the village population were ethnic Serbs (282/325),  6.46% were Yugoslavs  (21/325), 4.62% were ethnic Croats (15/325), while 2.15% were of other ethnic origin (7/325).

{{Kretanje broja stanovnika
 |naslov  = 'Historical population 1857-2011 Naselja i stanovništvo Republike Hrvatske 1857-2001, www.dzs.hr
 |dimx    = 550
 |dimy    = 450
 |stanmax = 620
 |crta1   = 100
 |crta2   = 50
 |a1      = 1857
 |a2      = 1869
 |a3      = 1880
 |a4      = 1890
 |a5      = 1900
 |a6      = 1910
 |a7      = 1921
 |a8      = 1931
 |a9      = 1948
 |a10     = 1953
 |a11     = 1961
 |a12     = 1971
 |a13     = 1981
 |a14     = 1991
 |a15     = 2001
 |a16     = 2011
 |p1      = 315
 |p2      = 370
 |p3      = 408
 |p4      = 528
 |p5      = 614
 |p6      = 561
 |p7      = 552
 |p8      = 596
 |p9      = 365
 |p10     = 328
 |p11     = 356
 |p12     = 351
 |p13     = 333
 |p14     = 325
 |p15     = 163
 |p16     = 141
 |izvor   = Croatian Bureau of Statistics
 }}

Culture
 Zvuci Banije - an amateur group nurturing traditional folk singing and dancing

Sights and events
 Banijsko prelo''

References

Populated places in Sisak-Moslavina County
Serb communities in Croatia